The Giant earthworm is a name often given to a variety of large invertebrates in the class Clitellata, many being from the family Megascolecidae. It may refer to:

Australia and New Zealand
Giant Gippsland earthworm, up to 3 m in length
Spenceriella gigantea, up to 1.4 m in length
Lake Pedder earthworm, extinct

North America
Giant Palouse earthworm, up to 1 m in length
Oregon giant earthworm, up to 0.9 m in length

South America
Rhinodrilus fafner, extinct

Europe
Lumbricus badensis, up to 0.6 m in length

Africa
Microchaetus rappi up to 6.7 m in length

Southeast Asia
Kinabalu giant earthworm, up to 0.7 m in length

Cryptozoology
Indus worm, Pakistan
Lambton Worm, North East England
Minhocão, Brazil
Mongolian death worm, Gobi Desert
Tatzelwurm, European Alps, a hoax

See also
Archispirostreptus gigas, a giant millipede
Caecilian, a worm-like amphibian
Giant tube worm
Lineus longissimus or bootlace worm, up to 55 metres long
Marine worm
Sheltopusik, a glass lizard with worm-like appearance
Sphaerotheriida, the giant pill millipede

Animal common name disambiguation pages